Keçiören Bağlumspor, formerly Bağlum Belediyespor, is a Turkish football club located in the Keçiören district of Ankara and is owned by the municipal administration. Their colors are green and yellow.

References

External links
Keçiören Bağlumspor on TFF.org

Football clubs in Turkey
1963 establishments in Turkey
Keçiören Bağlum SK
Association football clubs established in 1963